The 1986 World Aquatics Championships took place in M86 Swimming Center in Madrid, Spain between August 13 and August 23, 1986, with 1119 participating athletes. In swimming, the 50 m freestyle events and women's 4 × 200 m freestyle relay were held for the first time.

Medal table

Medal summary

Diving

Men

Women

Swimming

Men

Women

Synchronised swimming

Water polo
Men

Women

External links
FINA Official Website
World Swimming Championship Results
1986 World Aquatics Championships Results

 
FINA World Aquatics Championships
World Aquatics Championships, 1986
Aquatics Championships, 1986
Sports competitions in Madrid
World 1986